The following is a list of classic female blues singers.

A 
 Mozelle Alderson
 Ora Alexander

B 

 Mildred Bailey
 Blue Lu Barker
 Gladys Bentley
 Esther Bigeou
 Lucille Bogan
 Ada Brown
 Bessie Brown
 Eliza Brown
 Kitty Brown

C 

 Alice Carter
 Alice Leslie Carter
 Martha Copeland
 Ida Cox
 Katie Crippen

D 
 Madlyn Davis
Mattie Dorsey

E 

 Bernice Edwards

F 
 Ethel Finnie
 Miss Frankie

G 
 Cleo Gibson
 Lillian Glinn
 Lillian Goodner
 Ida Goodson
 Fannie May Goosby
 Coot Grant
 Helen Gross

H 

 Marion Harris
 Lucille Hegamin
 Edmonia Henderson
 Katherine Henderson
 Rosa Henderson
 Edna Hicks
 Bertha "Chippie" Hill
 Mattie Hite
 Rosetta Howard
 Helen Humes
 Alberta Hunter

I 
 Bertha Idaho

J 
 Edith North Johnson
 Lil Johnson
 Mary Johnson
 Merline Johnson
 Maggie Jones

L 
 Virginia Liston

M 

 Ida May Mack
 Daisy Martin
 Sara Martin
 Viola McCoy
 Hazel Meyers
 Josie Miles
 Lizzie Miles
 Monette Moore

R 

 Ma Rainey
 Elzadie Robinson

S 

 Bessie Smith
 Clara Smith
 Laura Smith
 Mamie Smith
 Ruby Smith
 Trixie Smith
 Victoria Spivey
 Mary Stafford
 Hannah Sylvester

T 
 Eva Taylor
 Bessie Tucker
 Lavinia Turner

W 

 Sippie Wallace
 Ethel Waters
 Georgia White
 Edith Wilson
 Lena Wilson

Y 
 Estelle Yancey

See also 
 Women in music

Notes

References 
 Bogdanov, Vladimir; Woodstra, Chris; and Erlewine, Stephen Thomas (2003). All Music Guide to the Blues: The Definitive Guide to the Blues. San Francisco, California: Backbeat Books. .
 Harrison, Daphne Duval (1990). Black Pearls: Blues Queens of the 1920s. New Brunswick and London: Rutgers. .
 Stewart-Baxter, Derrick (1970). Ma Rainey and the Classic Blues Singers. London: Studio Vista. 
 Russell, Tony (1997). The Blues: From Robert Johnson to Robert Cray. Dubai: Carlton Books, 

Classic female
 
Lists of women in music